The Julien Dubuque Bridge is a bridge over the Mississippi River that connects Dubuque, Iowa and East Dubuque, Illinois. The bridge is part of U.S. Route 20 (US 20).

Description 
The Julien Dubuque Bridge is a light grey color. The bridge spans  and is 28 feet wide. The longest span is 845 feet.

History
For a number of years, people living in the area wanted a bridge to replace the old bridge, which was called either the "High Bridge" or the "Wagon Bridge." However, economic conditions at the time made it difficult to get the financing together to build a new bridge.

During World War II, a new bridge became even more important as it would help facilitate military transportation. In 1942, the first parts of the bridge were begun. In 1943, the bridge was completed. It was painted gray to help camouflage the bridge in case of enemy attack.

Because the bridge was financed with bonds, it initially operated as a toll bridge. Money from the tolls was used to repay the debts. large traffic paid the debts 11 years ahead a schedule and the bridge was toll free by 1954.

In the early 1990s, the bridge underwent an extensive renovation. The deck was replaced, and a new walkway was installed. For many years, the bridge was dark green; however, in more recent times it again has been painted the current light gray color.

Prior to the construction of the Dubuque-Wisconsin Bridge, the Julien Dubuque Bridge also carried US 61 and US 151. This resulted in both of these highways passing a short distance through Jo Daviess County, Illinois, between Dubuque and Wisconsin. Now both highways cross the Mississippi on the Dubuque–Wisconsin Bridge, which directly connects Wisconsin and Iowa, and neither US 61 nor US 151 passes through Illinois.

On June 9, 2008, the bridge was struck by a number of runaway barges shortly after 8 p.m. Fifteen barges—which were loaded with corn, soybeans, and iron ore—struck one of the pillars on the eastern side of the main channel. Unsure of whether the bridge was stable, authorities temporarily closed it until an inspection could be performed. Traffic was rerouted on to the Dubuque–Wisconsin Bridge a few miles to the north.

See also

 List of crossings of the Upper Mississippi River

References

Through arch bridges in the United States
Bridges of the United States Numbered Highway System
Bridges completed in 1943
Bridges over the Mississippi River
Road bridges on the National Register of Historic Places in Illinois
National Register of Historic Places in Jo Daviess County, Illinois
Buildings and structures in Dubuque, Iowa
Culture of Dubuque, Iowa
Transportation in Dubuque, Iowa
U.S. Route 20
Continuous truss bridges in the United States
Road bridges on the National Register of Historic Places in Iowa
National Register of Historic Places in Dubuque, Iowa
Transportation buildings and structures in Jo Daviess County, Illinois
Great River Road
Former toll bridges in Illinois
Former toll bridges in Iowa
Bridges in Dubuque County, Iowa
Interstate vehicle bridges in the United States